Deh Sefid-e Sofla (also Romanized as Deh Sefīd-e Soflá and Deh Sefīd Soflá) is a village in Zagheh Rural District, Zagheh District, Khorramabad County, Lorestan Province, Iran. At the 2006 census, its population was 327, in 57 families.

References 

Towns and villages in Khorramabad County